Ikertooq Fjord (old spelling: Ikertôq) is a  long fjord in the Qeqqata municipality in western Greenland.

Geography 

The tributary bays, from south to north, are: Avalleq, Akulleq (the innermost, main arm at approximately ), and Maligiaq. Itinneq, an outflow river from the large, latitudinal Tasersuaq lake, empties into the northern inlet.

The fjord is unusual in that it connects through a very narrow waterway to the head of the narrower Amerloq Fjord near the village of Sarfannguit.

The northern inlet at the fjord head is surrounded by tall mountains immediately to the south of the Pingu mountain group halfway between Davis Strait and the Greenland ice sheet. The range flattens considerably towards the east in the area of Kangaamiut dike swarm north of Kangerlussuaq, due to pressure exerted by the icesheet for long periods in the past.

Settlement 
The small Sarfannguit settlement occupies the eastern promontory on Sarfannguit Island, on the northern shore of the fjord, at the narrow waterway between the mainland and Sarfannguit Island. In the past, the coastal region was dotted with several small villages, all of which are now abandoned.

References 

Davis Strait
Fjords of Greenland